The Women's Hospital Classic is a tournament for professional female tennis players played on outdoor hard courts. The event is classified as a $60,000 ITF Women's World Tennis Tour tournament and has been held in Evansville, Indiana, United States, since 1999.

Past finals

Singles

Doubles

External links 
 ITF search

ITF Women's World Tennis Tour
Clay court tennis tournaments
Tennis tournaments in the United States
Tennis tournaments in Indiana
1999 establishments in the United States
Recurring sporting events established in 1999
1999 establishments in Indiana
Women's sports in Indiana
Evansville, Indiana